Thomas Wesley Anderson was a member of the Wisconsin State Assembly.

Biography
Anderson was born on March 30, 1828 in Eaton, New York. Eventually, he owned a farm in Stockton, Wisconsin. He died on December 18, 1916.

Assembly career
Anderson was a member of the Assembly during the 1876 session. He was a Republican.

References

People from Madison County, New York
People from Stockton, Wisconsin
Republican Party members of the Wisconsin State Assembly
Farmers from Wisconsin
1828 births
1916 deaths
19th-century American politicians